Loznoye is a rural locality (a selo) and the administrative center of Loznovskoye Rural Settlement, Dubovsky District, Volgograd Oblast, Russia. The population was 1,356 as of 2010. There are 20 streets.

Geography 
Loznoye is located 42 km northwest of Dubovka (the district's administrative centre) by road. Malaya Ivanovka is the nearest rural locality.

References 

Rural localities in Dubovsky District, Volgograd Oblast
Tsaritsynsky Uyezd